Joseph Howard (12 January 1871 – 25 January 1951) was an English first-class cricketer, who played five games for Worcestershire at the turn of the twentieth century.

He made his debut against Yorkshire in May 1900, opening the batting in both innings but making only 0 and 1 as Worcestershire were beaten by an innings and five runs in a very low-scoring game (Worcs 43 & 51; Yorks 99). His highest score of 28 came in his last match, against Marylebone Cricket Club (MCC) in June 1901; this was also the scene of the only catch he took in his career, to dismiss John Rawlin.

Howard was born in Epsom, Surrey; he died at Evenlode House in Gloucestershire at the age of 80.

External links
 

1871 births
1951 deaths
English cricketers
Worcestershire cricketers